Dichomeris melanosoma is a moth in the family Gelechiidae. It was described by Edward Meyrick in 1920. It is found in Tanzania and Kenya.

References

Moths described in 1920
melanosoma